State Highway 91 (SH 91) is a  stretch of state highway in the U.S. state of Colorado. SH 91's southern terminus is at U.S. Route 24 (US 24) in Leadville, and the northern terminus is at Interstate 70 (I-70) at Copper Mountain.

Route description
 begins at an intersection with US 24 in Leadville. It travels to the northeast over Fremont Pass, passing the ghost town of Climax, home of the recently reopened Climax mine.  

 ends at an interchange with I-70 at Wheeler Junction. Since the development of the Copper Mountain Ski Resort area, Wheeler Junction is more commonly referred to as Copper Mountain.

History
As constructed in the 1920s, State Highway 91 went from Leadville, via Climax, Fremont Pass, Frisco, and Loveland Pass, to Empire, where it joined US 40.  The segment from Leadville to Climax was paved by 1936, and the entire route was paved by 1954.  In 1938, route 91 became US 6, until US 6 was rerouted over Vail Pass in 1941, leaving the portion of route 91 from Copper Mountain (formerly Wheeler Junction) to Leadville as the surviving part of this historic highway.

Major intersections

See also

References

External links

 

091
Transportation in Lake County, Colorado
Transportation in Summit County, Colorado